Huron—Bruce (formerly known as Huron and Huron—Middlesex) is a federal electoral district in Ontario, Canada, that has been represented in the House of Commons of Canada since 1953.

History

The riding was created in 1952 from parts of Huron North and Huron—Perth ridings. It consisted of the township of Hibbert in the county of Perth, and the townships of Hullett, McKillop, Stanley, Tuckersmith, Hay, Stephen, Usborne, Grey, Morris, Colborne, Goderich, Ashfield, East Wawanosh and West Wawanosh in the county of Huron.

In 1966, it was redefined to consist of the County of Huron excluding the Village of Lucknow, and the Village of Ailsa Craig and the Townships of Biddulph and McGillivray in the County of Middlesex.

It was known as "Huron" until 1974. It was known as "Huron—Middlesex" from 1974 to 1976.

In 1976, it was renamed "Huron—Bruce", and defined to consist of the County of Huron and the Townships of Carrick, Culross, Huron and Kinloss in the County of Bruce.

In 1987, the Bruce County portion was redefined as the part of the County of Bruce lying west of and excluding the townships of Carrick, Brant and Elderslie, west of and including the Village of Paisley, west of and excluding the Townships of Elderslie and Arran, and west of and including the Township of Saugeen and the Town of Southampton.

In 2003, the Bruce County portion was redefined as the part of the County of Bruce lying southwest of and excluding the Township of Arran-Elderslie, and west of and including the Town of Saugeen Shores.

This riding was left unchanged after the 2012 electoral redistribution.

Demographics

Members of Parliament

This riding has elected the following Members of Parliament:

Election results

Huron—Bruce (1976–present)

	

				
					

Note: Conservative vote is compared to the total of the Canadian Alliance vote and Progressive Conservative vote in 2000 election.

Note: Canadian Alliance vote is compared to the Reform vote in 1997 election.

Huron—Middlesex (1974–1976)

Huron (1952–1974)

See also
 List of Canadian federal electoral districts
 Past Canadian electoral districts

References

Federal riding history from the Library of Parliament
results]
2011 Results from Elections Canada
 Campaign expense data from Elections Canada

Notes

Ontario federal electoral districts
Goderich, Ontario
1952 establishments in Ontario